= MV Southern Lily =

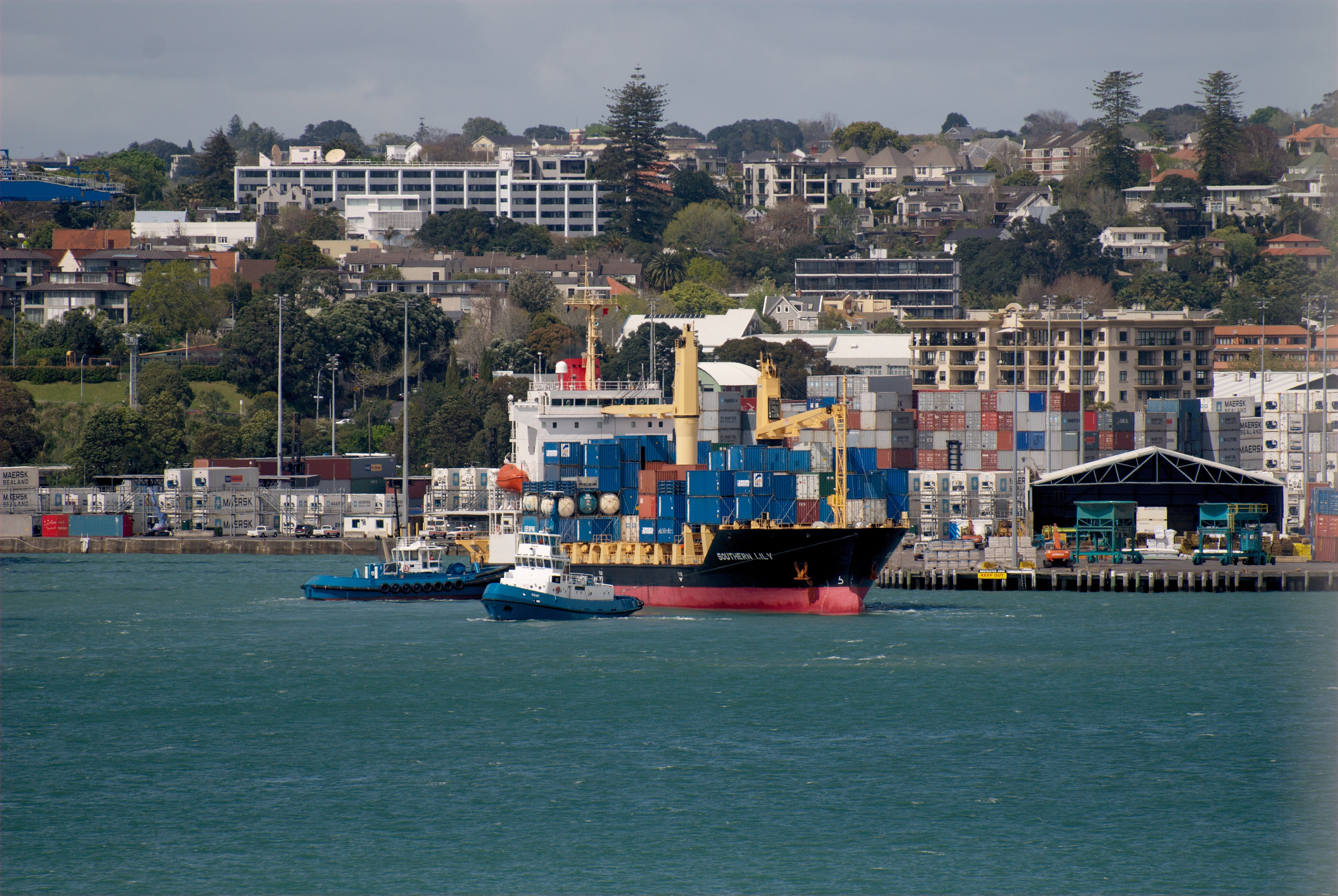
- Southern Lily docking in Auckland

History

New Zealand
- Name: Southern Lily
- Operator: Pacific Direct Line
- Launched: 2007
- Acquired: 2007
- In service: 2007
- Identification: IMO number: 9353931; MMSI number: 565406000; Callsign: 9VBR7
- Status: In service

General characteristics
- Tonnage: 6,245 gross tons
- Length: 99.99 m
- Beam: 20.79 m
- Speed: 14 knots
- Capacity: 606 TEU / 60 Plugs
- Notes: Cargo gear – two 45 ton cranes

MV Southern Lily is a ship of the Pacific Direct Line, which is a subsidiary of PDL International PTE Ltd, a Singapore-based company.

The Southern Lily operates a regular service carrying containers and hold cargo on the route between New Zealand (Auckland) and Tonga, and Samoa (Apia and Pago Pago).

On Tuesday 14 June 2016, the ship helped rescue three crewmen from the sailing vessel Platino when it started to take on water in a storm. On Saturday 18 November 2017, the Southern Lily rescued two Norwegian sailors 260 kilometres (160 mi) off the Northland coast after their sailing vessel Ilanga had caught fire.
